Bill Brady may refer to:
Bill Brady (baseball) (1889–1956), Major League Baseball player
Bill Brady (journalist) (born 1932), Canadian print and radio journalist
Bill Brady (politician) (born 1961), Republican state senator and former candidate for governor
Dollar Bill (real name Bill Brady), a character in the Watchmen series

See also
William Brady (disambiguation)
Brady Bill